The Reefs Hotel & Club, commonly known as The Reefs, is a luxury four-star resort hotel in Southampton Parish. Bermuda, located next to the Sonesta Beach Resort and not far from Gibbs Hill Lighthouse. In 2011, it was recognised by the Condé Nast Traveller Reader's Choice Awards and Travel + Leisure rated it the 23rd-best hotel in the Caribbean, Bermuda, and the Bahamas that year.

History
It has been built around the ruins of a 1680 farmhouse at Christian Bay, Southampton, and was originally owned by Marmaduke Dando, The Reefs Beach Club, as it was known, opened its doors in 1947. It was the first cabana-style beach resort in Bermuda.

With its distinctive white Bermudian roofs – Mark Twain called them the "icing on the cake" – and it's salmon pink walls. The reefs quickly became a popular resort on Bermuda's south shore. In 1972 it reportedly had 43 rooms.

Between the early 1970s and mid-1980s, the original cabanas were demolished and replaced by new guest accommodations, the resort's first pool and updated dining venues. 

A $5 million major renovation began in the early 2000s, which added 11 suites, in-room entertainment and Bermuda's first freshwater infinity pool. The renovations also included updates to the dining venues.

In 2007, The Reefs celebrated its 60th anniversary with the commencement of $55 million in renovations for a new dining, a new spa and new private Club residences. In July 2009, the Club residences and the new La Serena Spa opened.

The Reefs have been owned by Bermudian David Dodwell since 1981. Mr. Dodwell was formerly the Bermudian Minister of Tourism[1], was recognised in 1992 as the Bermuda Hotelier of the Year and in 2010 was honoured as the Hotelier of the Year by the Caribbean Hotel and Tourism Association for The Reefs' sister property, Nisbet Plantation Beach Club on Nevis.

Architecture

Situated on limestone cliffs overlooking pink sand in the southeast of Bermuda, the cabana-style limestone walled buildings and cottages are noted for their distinct pink and white colour.

The Reefs has 62 guest rooms, suites and cottages, as well as 19 furnished 2- and 3-bedroom luxury Club condos. Accommodations are categorised as: Poolside rooms, Cliffside rooms, Longtail Suite, Junior Suites, Point Suites, Cottages, and Club Condos.

Restaurants
The Reefs has three on-site restaurants, which are some of the most notable restaurants in Bermuda, and a bar. Ocean Echo is a 180-degree view restaurant serving continental cuisine. Royston's is a restaurant with a fireplace and open-air kitchen. Coconuts is an open-air restaurant, open seasonally, and located adjacent to the resort beach.

Amenities
On-site amenities include a freshwater infinity swimming pool and hot tub, two tennis courts, a fitness center, and snorkelling equipment, kayaks and floats at the beach. In the summer, The Reefs offers oceanfront yoga at Caso's Point.

La Serena Spa at The Reefs is Bermuda's only Elemis spa.

References

Hotels in Bermuda
Hotels established in 1947
1947 establishments in Bermuda
Southampton Parish, Bermuda